Giorgio Amendola (21 November 1907 – 5 June 1980) was an Italian writer and politician. He is regarded and often cited as one of the main precursors of the Olive Tree. Born in Rome in 1907, Amendola was the son of Lithuanian intellectual Eva Kuhn and Giovanni Amendola, a liberal anti-fascist who died in 1926 in Cannes after having been attacked by killers hired by Benito Mussolini. He secretly joined the Italian Communist Party (PCI) in 1929. After graduating in law, he started to propagandize opposition to the Mussolini regime.

Arrested and brought in exile in France, and successively banished to Santo Stefano Island in the Pontine Islands, Amendola was freed in 1943 by the resistance troops, which he then joined. After World War II, he served as a deputy in the Italian Parliament for the PCI from 1948 until his death in 1980. He became known especially in the 1970s as one of the leaders of the party's right wing, which espoused gradual removal of the ideas of Soviet Communism and Leninism, and supported alliances with the more moderate parties, especially the Italian Socialist Party, a concept later called Eurocommunism. One of his main allies was Giorgio Napolitano, a member of the Chamber of Deputies who became President of Italy (2006–2015) and remains an avowed disciple and follower of Amendola.

From 1967 onwards, Amendola started to work as a writer; his most notable books include Comunismo, antifascismo e Resistenza ("Communism, Anti-Fascism and Resistance", 1967), Lettere a Milano ("Letters to Milan", 1973), Intervista sull'antifascismo ("Interview on Anti-Fascism", 1976, with Piero Melograni), Una scelta di vita ("A Choice of Life", 1978), and Un'isola ("An Island", 1980), which is considered to be his best work. Amendola died in Rome, aged 72, after a long illness. His wife Germaine Lecocq, whom he met during his French exile in Paris and who helped him to write his last work, died a few hours after Amendola.

Sources

1907 births
1980 deaths
Politicians from Rome
Writers from Rome
Italian people of Lithuanian descent
Italian Communist Party politicians
Members of the Constituent Assembly of Italy
Deputies of Legislature I of Italy
Deputies of Legislature II of Italy
Deputies of Legislature III of Italy
Deputies of Legislature IV of Italy
Deputies of Legislature V of Italy
Deputies of Legislature VI of Italy
Deputies of Legislature VII of Italy
Deputies of Legislature VIII of Italy
Italian resistance movement members
Italian anti-fascists
20th-century Italian writers
20th-century Italian male writers
Exiled Italian politicians